Zvezda (meaning "star"), Salyut DOS-8, also known as the Zvezda Service Module, is a module of the International Space Station (ISS). It was the third module launched to the station, and provided all of the station's life support systems, some of which are supplemented in the US Orbital Segment (USOS), as well as living quarters for two crew members. It is the structural and functional center of the Russian Orbital Segment (ROS), which is the Russian part of the ISS. Crew assemble here to deal with emergencies on the station.

The module was manufactured in the USSR by RKK Energia, with major sub-contracting work by GKNPTs Khrunichev. Zvezda was launched on a Proton launch vehicle on 12 July 2000, and docked with the Zarya module on 26 July 2000.

Origins 

The basic structural frame of Zvezda, known as "DOS-8", was initially built in the mid-1980s to be the core of the Mir-2 space station. This means that Zvezda is similar in layout to the core module (DOS-7) of the Mir space station. It was in fact labeled as Mir-2 for quite some time in the factory. Its design lineage thus extends back to the original Salyut stations. The space frame was completed in February 1985 and major internal equipment was installed by October 1986.

The Mir-2 space station was redesigned after the failure of the Polyus orbital weapons platform core module to reach orbit. Zvezda is around  the size of Polyus, and has no armaments.

Design 
Zvezda consists of the cylindrical "Work Compartment" where the crews work and live (and which makes up the bulk of the module's volume), the small spherical "Transfer Compartment" located at the front (with three docking ports), and at the aft end the cylindrical "Transfer Chamber" (with one docking port) which is surrounded by the unpressurized "Assembly Compartment" – this gives Zvezda four docking ports in total. The solar panels extend .

The "Transfer Compartment" attaches to the Zarya module, and has docking ports intended for the Science Power Platform (SPP) and the Universal Docking Module (UDM). As in the early days of Mir, the transfer compartment provides a suitable EVA airlock where spacewalkers in Orlan space suits removed a hatch after closing a few that connected the compartment to the rest of the station. It was used only during Expedition 2, where Yury Usachov and James Voss put a docking cone on the nadir port. The lower port connects to Pirs and the top port connects to Poisk. Eventually, the plan for Pirs was for it to be deorbited on 23 July 2021 and replaced by Nauka (Multipurpose Laboratory Module) docking on 29 July 2021.

The "Assembly Compartment" holds external equipment such as thrusters, thermometers, antennas, and propellant tanks. The large movable "Lira satellite communications antenna" is located on the Zvezda service module near the aft or rear of the International Space Station on this Assembly Compartment. The "Transfer Chamber" is equipped with automatic docking equipment and is used to service Soyuz and Progress spacecraft.

Zvezda can support up to six crew  including separate sleeping quarters for two cosmonauts at a time. It also has a NASA-provided Treadmill with Vibration Isolation System, a kitchen equipped with a refrigerator/freezer and a table, a bicycle for exercise, a toilet and other hygiene facilities. The crew's wastewater and condensation water pulled out of the cabin air is recycled. Zvezda has been criticized for being excessively noisy and the crew has been observed wearing earplugs inside it.

Zvezda has 14 windows. There are two  diameter windows, one in each of the two crew sleep compartments (windows No. 1 and 2), six  diameter windows (No. 3, 4, 5, 6, 7 and 8) on the forward Transfer Compartment earth-facing floor, a  diameter window in the main Working Compartment (No. 9), and one  diameter window in the aft transfer compartment (No. 10). There are a further three  diameter windows in the forward end of the forward transfer compartment (No. 12, 13 and 14), for observing approaching craft. Window No. 11 is unaccounted for in all available sources.

Zvezda also contains the Elektron system that electrolyzes condensed humidity and waste water to provide hydrogen and oxygen. The hydrogen is expelled into space and the oxygen (up to 5.13 kg per day is generated) is used for breathing air. The condensed water and the waste water can be used for drinking in an emergency, but ordinarily fresh water from Earth is used. The Elektron system has required significant maintenance work, having failed several times and requiring the crew to use the Solid Fuel Oxygen Generator canisters (also called "oxygen candles", which were the cause of a fire on Mir) when it has been broken for extended amounts of time. It also contains the Vozdukh, a system which removes carbon dioxide from the air based on the use of regenerable absorbers of carbon dioxide gas. Zvezda is also the home of the Lada Greenhouse, which is a test for growing plants in space.

The Service Module has 16 small thrusters as well as two large  S5.79 thrusters that are 2-axis mounted and can be gimballed 5°. The thrusters are pressure-fed from four tanks with a total capacity of 860 kg. The oxidizer used for the propulsion system is dinitrogen tetroxide and the fuel is UDMH, the supply tanks being pressurised with nitrogen. The two main engines on Zvezda can be used to raise the station's altitude. This was done on 25 April 2007. This was the first time the engines had been fired since Zvezda arrived in 2000.

The Mir space station and Zvezda had the same design problem of launching with all the hardware permanently installed. Russian (and Soviet) space doctrine has always been to fix the hardware onboard instead of simply replacing them like the US Orbital Segment (USOS) does with the 41.3 inch (105 cm) wide International Standard Payload Racks that can easily fit through the 51 inch (130 cm) wide hatch openings through the modules connected via the Common Berthing Mechanism (CBM). This means broken but unfixable hardware onboard the Mir modules and Zvezda end up being stuck there forever and can't be replaced. ESA Italian astronaut Luca Parmitano in 2020 said that the originally installed computers in Zvezda don't work anymore and the central command post's computers are now three Lenovo ThinkPad laptops. The broken computers' monitors, keyboard, and other devices are left there as it is but cannot be removed and replaced. The pre-installed Elektron oxygen generating system also has to be fixed frequently by cosmonauts instead of simply being replaced due to the problem of Zvezda's 78.74 cm (31 inch) wide hatch and the inability to replace the Elektron with another Elektron. Another reason why Elektrons can't be replaced is because the three Elektron units that were launched on Zvezda were the last units ever manufactured. The original manufacturers went out of business and the single engineer who made the tweaks for the Elektrons that were installed on Zvezda died with all his secrets and knowledge not passed to anybody else.  In October 2020, the Elektron system malfunctioned yet again and had to be deactivated.

Connection to the ISS 

The rocket used for launch to the ISS carried advertising; it was emblazoned with the logo of Pizza Hut restaurants, for which they are reported to have paid more than US$1 million. The money helped support Khrunichev State Research and Production Space Center and the Russian advertising agencies that orchestrated the event.

Management and integration of the Service Module into the International Space Station began in 1991. Structural construction was performed by RKK Energia, then handed over to the Krhunichev Design Bureau for final outfitting. Joint reviews between the Russian Space Agency (Roscosmos) and the NASA ISS Program Office monitored construction, solved language and security concerns and ensured flight readiness and crew training. Several years of delay were encountered due to funding constraints between Roscosmos and RKK Energia requiring repeated delays in First Element Launch.
  
On 26 July 2000, Zvezda became the third component of the ISS when it docked at the aft port of Zarya. (The U.S. Unity module had already been attached to Zarya). Later in July, the computers aboard Zarya handed over ISS commanding functions to computers on Zvezda.

On 11 September 2000, two members of the STS-106 Space Shuttle crew completed final connections between Zvezda and Zarya; during a 6-hour, 14 minute EVA, astronaut Ed Lu and cosmonaut Yuri Malenchenko connected nine cables between Zvezda and Zarya, including four power cables, four video and data cables and a fiber-optic telemetry cable. The next day, STS-106 crew members floated into Zvezda for the first time, at 05:20 UTC on 12 September 2000.

Zvezda provided early living quarters, a life support system, a communication system (Zvezda introduced a 10 Mbit/s Ethernet network to the ISS ), electrical power distribution, a data processing system, a flight control system, and a propulsion system. These quarters and some, but not all, systems have since been supplemented by additional ISS components.

Launch risks 
Due to Russian financial problems, Zvezda was launched with no backup and no insurance. Due to this risk, NASA had constructed an Interim Control Module (ICM) in case it was delayed significantly or destroyed on launch.

Interior

Crew

Exterior

Dockings 

 

Aft port
 Progress MS-02 63P, 2016
 Progress M-29M 61P, 2015–2016
 Soyuz TMA-16M, 2015 
 Georges Lemaître ATV-5, 2014–2015
 Progress M-21M, 2013–2014
 Soyuz TMA-09M, 2013
 Albert Einstein ATV-4, 2013
 Progress M-17M 49P, 2012–2013
 Edoardo Amaldi ATV-3 2012 
 Progress M-11M 43P, 2011 
 Johannes Kepler ATV-2 2011 
 Progress M-07M 39P, 2010
 Progress M-06M 38P, 2010 
 Soyuz TMA-19, 2010
 Soyuz TMA-17, 2010 
 Progress M-04M 36P, 2010 
 Soyuz TMA-16, 2009–2010
 Progress M-67 34P, 2009
 Jules Verne ATV-1 2008 
 Progress M-65 30P, 2008
 Progress M-60 25P, 2007
 Progress M-58 23P, 2006–2007
 Soyuz TMA-9 2006 
 Soyuz TMA-7 2006
 Progress M-56 21P, 2006
 Progress M-54 19P, 2005–2006 
 Progress M-53 18P, 2005
 Progress M-52 17P, 2005
 Progress M-51 16P, 2004–2005
 Progress M-50 15P, 2004 
 Progress M-49 14P, 2004 
 Progress M1-11 13P, 2004
 Progress M-48 12P, 2003–2004
 Progress M-47 10P, 2003 
 Progress M1-9 9P, 2002–2003
 Progress M-46 8P, 2002
 Progress M1-8 7P, 2002
 Progress M1-7 6P, 2001–2002
 Progress M-45 5P, 2001 
 Progress M1-6 4P, 2001 
 Progress M-44 3P, 2001
 Progress M1-3 1P, 2000 (1st)

Nadir
 Pirs, 2001-2021
 Nauka, 2021–present

Zenith
 Poisk, 2009–present

Forward
 Zarya, 2000–present

References

External links 
 Zvezda @ RuSpace  (includes diagrams)

Russian components of the International Space Station
Spacecraft launched in 2000
2000 in Russia